Hur Jun, The Original Story is a 2013 South Korean television series about the life of Heo Jun, a commoner who rose up the ranks to become a royal physician in Joseon (he used the pen name "Guam"). It aired on MBC from March 18 to September 23, 2013 on Mondays to Fridays at 20:50 for 135 episodes.

Heo Jun was the author of the famed oriental medicine textbook Dongui Bogam (lit. "Mirror of Eastern Medicine"), considered the defining text of traditional Korean medicine. This was the fifth dramatization of his life. Lead actor Kim Joo-hyuk is the son of Kim Mu-saeng, who also played the same character in the 1975 series Tenacity.

Plot
Heo Jun is the son of a concubine and the governor of Yeongcheon. When he witnesses brilliant doctor Yoo Ui-tae save a dying person, he decides to become a doctor. First he works as a medicinal herb gatherer, then with the help of Ye-jin at Yoo Ui-tae's clinic, he studies rare medical texts imported from the Ming dynasty. With his expanded medical knowledge, Heo Jun begins to treat patients under Yoo Ui-tae's tutelage. But he later despairs of his inability to cure his mentor's stomach cancer. Despite the era's oppressive caste system and his commoner background, Heo Jun rises to the top of his field and becomes King Seonjo's royal physician.

Cast

Main cast
Kim Joo-hyuk as Heo Jun
Kang Han-byeol as young Heo Jun
Park Jin-hee as Ye-jin
Park Eun-bin as Da-hee
Namkoong Min as Yoo Do-ji
Baek Yoon-sik as Yoo Ui-tae

Supporting cast

Heo family
Go Doo-shim as Madam Son
Lee Jae-yong as Kim Min-se
Jung Ho-bin as Ahn Kwang-ik
Yeo Ho-min as Yang-tae
Jang Jae-won as young Yang-tae
Choi Sang-hoon as Heo Ryun
Kim Hye-jung as Lady Jang Jung-shil
Won Ki-joon as Heo Seok
Kang Yi-seok as young Heo Seok
Kim So-yeon  as Im Mi-hyun
Lee Hae-woo as Heo Gyeom

Gu family
Park Chul-min as Gu Il-seo
Kyeon Mi-ri as Ham Ahn-daek
Kwak Ji-min as Gu Un-nyeon
Son Heon-soo as Jang Man-deok

Yoo family
Kim Mi-sook as Lady Oh
Kim Hyo-yeon as Kwon Sook-jung
Shin Kwi-shik as Kwon Hyuk-soo

Pharmacy
Jung Eun-pyo as Im Oh-geun
Kim So-yi as Ha Dong-daek
Lee Da-yeon as Yoo Wol-yi
Jung Ji-ah as Cho-rye
Yoon Seul as Mi-geum
Kim Joong-ki as Busanpo
Oh Dae-hwan as Jang-swe
Go Young-min as Young-dal
Oh Yong as Gguk-swe

Royal Court
Jeon No-min as King Seonjo
Jang Ji-eun as Lady Kim Gong-bin 
Jung Si-ah as Lady Kim In-bin 
In Gyo-jin as Prince Gwanghae
Kim Jin-seong as Prince Sinseong
Seo Yi-ahn as Queen Inmok

Royal Hospital
Choi Jong-hwan as Yang Ye-soo
Lee Han-wi as Kim Man-kyung
Kim Hyuk as Kim Hong-ki
Kim Jung-hwan Lee Myung-hwan
Go Yoon-hoo as Jung Tae-eun
Yoo Seung-bong as Jung Jak
Kim Jin-ho as Kim Eung-taek
Hwang Bum-shik as Song Hak-gyu
Son Yeo-eun as So-hyun
Han Bo-bae as Chae-sun
Yoon Yoo-sun as Hong Choon-yi
Choi Ye-jin as Deok-geum
Ga Deuk-hee as Se-hee
Shin Bok-sook as Female palace physician 
Lee Seung-ah as Gae-geum
Kang Cho-hee as Ohn-ji
Lee Soo-in as Ok-jung
Park Kyung-hwan as Doyak Saryeong

Extended cast

Ji Sang-hyuk as Sang-hwa
Jo Soo-jung as Soo-yeon
 Jo Woo-jin as Woo Gong-bo
Lee Kye-in as Dol-swe
Hyun Chul-ho as Public officer Kim
Kim Byung-ki as Sung In-chul
Na Sung-kyun as Jung Sung-pil
Song Jae-hee as Lee Jung-myung
Kim Cheol-ki as Bae Chun-soo
Yoo Tae-woong as Kim Gong-ryang
Lee Chan as Kim Byung-jo
Shin Gook as Prime minister
Im Seung-dae as Eunuch
Joo Ah-sung as Gu Tae-hoon
Hwang Bo-mi as Lady Jang
Choi Hyun-seo as Eun-ok
Ryu Sung-hoon as Jang Jung
Hyun Chul-ho as Mr. Kim

Awards and nominations

References

External links
  
  
 

2013 South Korean television series debuts
2013 South Korean television series endings
MBC TV television dramas
Ho Chun
South Korean historical television series
South Korean medical television series
Television shows written by Choi Wan-kyu